Jane Marie Beckering (née Jane Marie Buchanan, born 1965) is a United States district judge of the United States District Court for the Western District of Michigan. She served as a judge of the 3rd District of the Michigan Court of Appeals from 2007 to 2021.

Education 

Beckering her Bachelor of Arts from the University of Michigan in 1987 and her Juris Doctor from the University of Wisconsin Law School in 1990.

Legal career 

Beckering started her career at McDermott, Will & Emery, LLP, in Chicago, Illinois, then returned to Grand Rapids, Michigan, and later founded the law firm of Buchanan & Beckering, PLC. She was a lawyer for 17 years, first in Chicago and then in Grand Rapids before she became a judge in 1997.

In 2006 as a lawyer Beckering sought the Democratic nomination for the Michigan Supreme Court. She made it to the general election ballot but placed a distant third behind incumbents Maura Corrigan and Michael Cavanagh.

Judicial career

State court service 

Beckering was appointed a Judge of the Michigan Court of Appeals by Governor Jennifer Granholm to replace Judge Janet T. Neff, who was appointed as a federal district court judge. She took office on September 10, 2007. Beckering is vice president of the Grand Rapids Bar Association, with a term set to expire on January 1, 2025. Her service terminated upon her elevation as a federal judge.

Federal judicial service 

On June 30, 2021, President Joe Biden announced his intent to nominate Beckering to serve as a United States district judge of the United States District Court for the Western District of Michigan. On July 13, 2021, her nomination was sent to the Senate. President Biden nominated Beckering to the seat vacated by Judge Janet T. Neff, who assumed senior status on March 1, 2021. A hearing on her nomination before the Senate Judiciary Committee was scheduled to take place on August 11, 2021, but was postponed. On October 6, 2021, a hearing on her nomination was held before the Senate Judiciary Committee. On October 28, 2021, her nomination was reported out of committee by a 12-9–1 vote. On December 17, 2021, the United States Senate invoked cloture on her nomination by a 46–24 vote. Her nomination was confirmed later that day by a 45–25 vote. She received her judicial commission on December 21, 2021.

Notes

References

External links 

|-

1965 births
Living people
21st-century American women lawyers
21st-century American lawyers
21st-century American judges
21st-century American women judges
Illinois lawyers
Judges of the United States District Court for the Western District of Michigan
Michigan Court of Appeals judges
Michigan lawyers
People from Grand Rapids, Michigan
United States district court judges appointed by Joe Biden
University of Michigan alumni
University of Wisconsin Law School alumni
Wisconsin lawyers